An Election to the Edinburgh Corporation was held on 1 May 1973, alongside municipal elections across Scotland. Of the councils 69 seats, 26 were up for election. Labour, despite needing only 1 gain to take control of the council, failed to do so, preventing them from a historic win.

Following the election, with two by-elections pending, Edinburgh Corporation was composed of 34 Labour councillors, 21 Conservatives, and 7 Liberals, with 5 others.

By this point only a small rump Progressive party remained on the council, with the bulk of Progressive councillors having joined the Conservatives. A small number, such as Mrs Catherine Filsell (a former Progressive leader), had joined Labour.

Aggregate results

Ward Results

References

1973
Edinburgh Corporation
Corporation election, 1973